Auratonota virgata is a species of moth of the family Tortricidae. It is found in Ecuador.

The wingspan is 18–20 mm. The ground colour of the forewings represented in the form of creamy fascia and somewhat darker strigulation (fine streaks) in the dorsal area. Otherwise, the forewings are strongly suffused rust. The hindwings are brownish grey and paler basally.

References

Moths described in 2000
Auratonota
Moths of South America